Egeria is a genus of three species of aquatic plants in the family Hydrocharitaceae described as a genus in 1849. native to warm-temperate South America.

Ecology
Egeria is found in many temperate and subtropical regions throughout the world as an introduced, or "alien", species, meaning a species that does not originate from the area in which it is found. In many places, particularly in Europe, fast-growing, adaptable plants such as Egeria can spread quickly and cause major damage to native plants and wildlife.

Taxonomy
The genus was formerly included in the related genus Elodea, from which it differs in having the leaves in whorls of four or more, not three, and in having more conspicuous flowers with larger (particularly broader) petals.

Species
The genus includes the following species:

 Egeria densa Planch. – S + SE Brazil, NE Argentina, Paraguay, Uruguay; naturalized in scattered locales in Europe, Africa, China, New Zealand, Hawaii, USA, Mesoamerica, West Indies
 Egeria heterostemon S.Koehler & C.P.Bove – Brazil
 Egeria najas Planch. – S + SE  + E Brazil, NE Argentina, Paraguay, Uruguay

References

Hydrocharitaceae
Hydrocharitaceae genera
Freshwater plants